This is a list of films which placed number one at the weekend box office in Japan for the year 2013. It lists the films with the highest box office gross only.

Highest-grossing films

See also
List of Japanese films of 2013

References

2013
2013 in Japanese cinema
Japan